The 2007 Bremen state election was held on 13 May 2007 to elect the members of the Bürgerschaft of Bremen, as well as the city councils of Bremen and Bremerhaven. The incumbent government of the Social Democratic Party (SPD) and Christian Democratic Union (CDU) retained its majority with losses. However, the SPD chose to form a new government with The Greens. Jens Böhrnsen was re-elected as Mayor.

This was the first election contested by The Left after the merger of the PDS and WASG. The new party achieved 8.4% of the vote, up from 1.7% for PDS in 2003, marking its first major success in a western state.

Parties
The table below lists parties represented in the previous Bürgerschaft of Bremen.

Opinion polling

Election result

|-
! rowspan="2" colspan="2" | Party
! rowspan="2" | Votes
! rowspan="2" | %
! rowspan="2" | +/-
! colspan="2" | Seats
! rowspan="2" | Totalseats
! rowspan="2" | +/-
! rowspan="2" | Seats %
|-
! Bremen
! Bremerhaven
|-
| bgcolor=| 
| align=left | Social Democratic Party (SPD)
| align=right| 101,290
| align=right| 36.7
| align=right| 5.6
| align=right| 27
| align=right| 5
| align=right| 32
| align=right| 8
| align=right| 38.6
|-
| bgcolor=| 
| align=left | Christian Democratic Union (CDU)
| align=right| 70,728
| align=right| 25.6
| align=right| 4.2
| align=right| 19
| align=right| 4
| align=right| 23
| align=right| 6
| align=right| 27.7
|-
| bgcolor=| 
| align=left | Alliance 90/The Greens (Grüne)
| align=right| 45,493
| align=right| 16.5
| align=right| 3.7
| align=right| 12
| align=right| 2
| align=right| 14
| align=right| 2
| align=right| 16.9
|-
| bgcolor=| 
| align=left | The Left (Linke)
| align=right| 23,282
| align=right| 8.4
| align=right| 6.7
| align=right| 6
| align=right| 1
| align=right| 7
| align=right| 7
| align=right| 8.4
|-
| bgcolor=| 
| align=left | Free Democratic Party (FDP)
| align=right| 16,486
| align=right| 6.0
| align=right| 1.8
| align=right| 4
| align=right| 1
| align=right| 5
| align=right| 4
| align=right| 6.0
|-
| bgcolor=| 
| align=left | German People's Union (DVU)
| align=right| 7,536
| align=right| 2.7
| align=right| 0.4
| align=right| 0
| align=right| 1
| align=right| 1
| align=right| 0
| align=right| 1.2
|-
| bgcolor=| 
| align=left | Citizens in Rage (BiW)
| align=right| 2,336
| align=right| 0.8
| align=right| 3.6
| align=right| 0
| align=right| 1
| align=right| 1
| align=right| 1
| align=right| 1.2
|-
! colspan=8|
|-
|
| align=left | Bremen Must Live
| align=right| 4,462
| align=right| 1.6
| align=right| 1.6
| align=right| 0
| align=right| 0
| align=right| 0
| align=right| ±0
| align=right| 0
|-
| bgcolor=|
| align=left | Others
| align=right| 4,203
| align=right| 1.5
| align=right| 
| align=right| 0
| align=right| 0
| align=right| 0
| align=right| ±0
| align=right| 0
|-
! align=right colspan=2| Total
! align=right| 275,816
! align=right| 100.0
! align=right| 
! align=right| 68
! align=right| 15
! align=right| 83
! align=right| ±0
! align=right| 
|-
! align=right colspan=2| Voter turnout
! align=right| 
! align=right| 57.6
! align=right| 3.7
! align=right| 
! align=right| 
! align=right| 
! align=right| 
! align=right| 
|}

Notes

References

Elections in Bremen (state)
2007 elections in Germany